Thames21 is a British charity concerned with water improvement projects across London, focused on the Thames and its tributaries.

Thames 21 developed from a partnership programme launched in 1994 called ThamesClean, supported by Keep Britain Tidy, the Port of London Authority, the Environment Agency, Thames Water, British Waterways, The City of London Corporation and 19 local authorities. In 2004 the charity became independent, also being rebranded Thames21, and is funded by a wide variety of charitable trusts, companies and public funding.

References

External links

Pollution
Environment of the United Kingdom
2004 establishments in the United Kingdom
Organizations established in 2004